Sant Benet (Susqueda) is a mountain of the Guilleries Massif, Catalonia, Spain. It has an elevation of 1,146.9 metres above sea level.

See also
Guilleries 
Mountains of Catalonia

References

Mountains of Catalonia